Whole-wheat flour (in the US) or wholemeal flour (in the UK) is a powdery substance, a basic food ingredient, derived by grinding or mashing the whole grain of wheat, also known as the wheatberry. Whole-wheat flour is used in baking of breads and other baked goods, and also typically mixed with lighter "white" unbleached or bleached flours (that have been treated with flour bleaching agent(s)) to restore nutrients (especially fiber, protein, and vitamins), texture, and body to the white flours that can be lost in milling and other processing to the finished baked goods or other food(s).

White whole wheat flour  
In the United States, white whole-wheat flour is flour milled from hard white spring wheat and contains the bran and germ. In the United Kingdom and India whole-wheat flour is more commonly made from white wheat instead of hard winter red wheat, as in the United States

See also
 Wheat flour
 Whole grain 
 Unifine Mill
 Graham bread an early attempt to reintroduce whole-wheat bread
 Roman Meal a whole grain baking company founded in 1912
 Enriched flour, normal flour with some nutrients in whole-wheat flour added

References

External links
Whole Wheat Bread, Mayo Clinic

Wheat flour
Flour